The 1991 Miami Redskins football team was an American football team that represented Miami University in the Mid-American Conference (MAC) during the 1991 NCAA Division I-A football season. In its second season under head coach Randy Walker, the team compiled a 6–4–1 record (4–3–1 against MAC opponents), finished in a tie for third place in the MAC, and outscored all opponents by a combined total of 214 to 140.

The team's statistical leaders included Jim Clement with 938 passing yards, Kevin Ellerbe with 708 rushing yards, and Milt Stegall with 489 receiving yards.

Schedule

References

Miami
Miami RedHawks football seasons
Miami Redskins football